The Australian Super Sedan Championship is a Dirt track racing championship held each year to determine the Australian national champion. The championship is held over a single meeting (usually on consecutive nights) and has run annually since the 1971/72 season and is awarded to a different state of Australia each year by the national controlling body, the Australian Saloon Car Federation (ASCF).

The first championship was run in Australia's capital city of Canberra at the now closed Fraser Park Speedway (later renamed Tralee Speedway) and was won by Kevin Dalton of Victoria.

The championship is separate to the National Super Sedan Series which has been in operation since 2006.

New South Wales driver Grenville Anderson (1951-2004), holds the record for most championship wins with four titles to his name - 1975/76 (Rowley Park Speedway in Adelaide, South Australia), 1977/78 (Claremont Speedway in Perth, Western Australia), 1979/80 (Bagot Park in Darwin, Northern Territory), and 1992/93 (Latrobe Speedway in Latrobe, Tasmania). Anderson also finished second in 1978/79 at the Charlton Speedway in Toowoomba, Queensland, and was easily the quickest driver at the 1991/92 championship at Speedway Park in Adelaide, not losing a race until a crash in his final heat saw his car severely damaged. Born in 1951, Anderson died in 2004 as a result of head injuries he sustained during a crash when running hot laps at Brisbane's Archerfield Speedway before the first night of the 1993/94 Australian Championships where he was the defending champion.

The current (2017/18) Australian Super Sedan champion is Tasmanian Callum Harper who won his 2nd crown at Parramatta, NSW in early March 2018.

Winners since 1971

** 1982-83 Championship was run over 3 rounds with an overall winner, runner up and 3rd place decided on points## 1983-84 The name was changed from National Super Sedan - Open Division to Super Sedans

See also

Motorsport in Australia

References

External links
ASCF Australian Super Sedan Championship Honour Roll

Super Sedan Championship
Super Sedan Championship
Super Sedan